Brunswick County Courthouse Square is a historic county courthouse complex and national historic district located at Lawrenceville, Brunswick County, Virginia. It encompasses four contributing buildings and two contributing objects.  They are the courthouse building, a clerk's office, library, jail, Confederate war monument, and a simple granite slab monument commemorating the county's veterans of World War I to the Vietnam War.  Together they constitute a classic Southern courthouse square. The courthouse was built in 1854–55, as 
a two-story, gable-roofed rectangular brick building in the Greek Revival style. In 1939, a rear brick addition was completed, creating a T-shaped plan.  The clerk's office is a two-story brick building built in 1893, with rear additions built in 1924 and 1939. The library was built in 1941.

It was listed on the National Register of Historic Places in 1974.  It is located in the Lawrenceville Historic District.

References

County courthouses in Virginia
Government buildings on the National Register of Historic Places in Virginia
Historic districts on the National Register of Historic Places in Virginia
Government buildings completed in 1855
Buildings and structures in Brunswick County, Virginia
National Register of Historic Places in Brunswick County, Virginia
Courthouses on the National Register of Historic Places in Virginia